Lazurnaya Bay is a bay on the east side of the Muravyov-Amursky Peninsula in Russia. It lies to the northeast of Vladivostok and to the southwest from the Three Little Pigs Bay. The Lazurnaya Bay forms part of the  Ussuri Bay in the Sea of Japan.

The toponym was coined in the 1970s and translates from Russian as "the Azure Bay". The older, traditional name is Shamora which supposedly translates from Chinese as "sandy desert".

The bay is known for its sandy beaches which attract scores of holiday-makers from Vladivostok and other towns of the Russian Far East. Several rest homes and sanatoriums are scattered along the coastline.  The hinterland is hilly and woody.

The Shamora beach gave its name to a collection of old songs by the Vladivostok band Mumiy Troll.

Bays of Primorsky Krai
Pacific Coast of Russia
Beaches of Russia